Lugovoy is a rural locality (a khutor) in Pochepskoye Rural Settlement, Liskinsky District, Voronezh Oblast, Russia. The population was 295 as of 2010. There are 3 streets.

Geography 
Lugovoy is located 24 km north of Liski (the district's administrative centre) by road. Davydovka is the nearest rural locality.

References 

Rural localities in Liskinsky District